Meegan Fitzharris (born 1972) is a former Australian politician, who was a member of the Australian Capital Territory Legislative Assembly for the Yerrabi electorate from October 2016 to July 2019, and before that, member for the electorate of Molonglo after she won a countback to fill the Legislative Assembly seat vacated by former Chief Minister, Katy Gallagher, in January 2015. She was the Minister for Transport and Municipal Services, Minister for Higher Education, Training and Research and Minister for Health until her resignation from politics in July 2019.

Life and career
Meegan Fitzharris was born in Wellington, New Zealand, in 1972. She was educated at the University of Otago and the University of Auckland, and holds a Bachelor of Commerce and a Masters in International Development.

Fitzharris moved to Australia in 1998. She has three children. She has New Zealand citizenship. 

Before commencing a political career, Fitzharris worked for New South Wales Police, Australian Federal Police and the Attorney-General's Department.

Politics
Fitzharris was a Labor Party candidate in the 2012 Australian Capital Territory general election. When she did not win a seat, she became the chief of staff and senior adviser for then Minister, later Chief Minister, Andrew Barr.

Chief Minister Katy Gallagher resigned from the Assembly on 23 December 2014 to pursue a seat in the Australian Senate. Ahead of Gallagher's resignation, media speculation was that Fitzharris would be the most likely candidate to take Gallagher's Assembly seat.

On 15 January 2015, ACT Electoral Commissioner Phil Green announced Fitzharris had been elected as the new member for Molonglo in the Legislative Assembly, after holding a countback of the 2012 Legislative Assembly election.

In January 2016, Fitzharris was appointed to the Barr ministry, taking on the transport, health and higher education portfolios and becoming one of ACT Labor's most senior frontbenchers. As transport minister, she oversaw the introduction of light rail in Canberra, but also weathered complaints about the rollout of a new bus network in 2019. As health minister, she ordered an inquiry into allegations of bullying and misconduct at ACT Health.

On 27 June 2019, Fitzharris announced she would resign from her cabinet roles on 1 July and would resign from politics for family reasons shortly after that. She resigned from the Legislative Assembly on 8 July, creating a casual vacancy which was filled by a countback.

References

|-

|-

|-

1972 births
Living people
Australian Labor Party members of the Australian Capital Territory Legislative Assembly
Australian public servants
Members of the Australian Capital Territory Legislative Assembly
University of Otago alumni
University of Auckland alumni
New Zealand emigrants to Australia
Naturalised citizens of Australia
21st-century Australian politicians
21st-century Australian women politicians
Women members of the Australian Capital Territory Legislative Assembly